Burtonwood and Westbrook is a civil parish in the Borough of Warrington in Cheshire, England, northwest of the town of Warrington.  It contains eight buildings that are recorded in the National Heritage List for England as designated listed buildings.  The parish includes the village of Burtonwood, and Westbrook, a suburb of the town of Warrington; otherwise it is rural.  The original Liverpool to Manchester railway line runs through the north of the parish, and provides it with its only Grade I listed structure, the Sankey Viaduct.  The other listed buildings are a church, two country houses, a gatehouse, and four farmhouses.

Key

Buildings

References
Citations

Sources

Listed buildings in Warrington
Lists of listed buildings in Cheshire